Aphanotorulus gomesi is a species of catfish in the family Loricariidae. It is native to South America, where it occurs in the Jaguaribe River basin. The species reaches 14.3 cm (5.6 inches) SL. It is thought to be a facultative air-breather.

A. gomesi was originally described as Plecostomus iheringi by Henry Weed Fowler in 1941, although Fowler later invalidated this name in 1942, replacing it with Plecostomus gomesi to avoid confusion with Plecostomus iheringii (a species which is currently known as Hypostomus iheringii). It was transferred to the genus Squaliforma (now considered invalid) after the genus' designation by I. J. H. Isbrücker, I. Seidel, J. Michels, E. Schraml, and A. Werner in 2001. In 2004, Jonathan W. Armbruster classified the species within Hypostomus instead of Squaliforma. In 2016, following a review of Isorineloricaria and Aphanotorulus by C. Keith Ray and Armbruster (both of Auburn University), the species was reclassified as a member of Aphanotorulus, although FishBase still lists the species as Squaliforma gomesi.

References 

Fish described in 1942
Freshwater fish of South America
Loricariidae